José de Souza Teixeira (25 September 1935 – 13 April 2018), known as José Teixeira, was a Brazilian football manager.

References

External links
 

1935 births
2018 deaths
Brazilian football managers
Campeonato Brasileiro Série A managers
Barretos Esporte Clube managers
Sport Club Corinthians Paulista managers
Esporte Clube Noroeste managers
Brazil national under-20 football team managers
Millonarios F.C. managers
Guarani FC managers
Al Nassr FC managers
Al Shabab Al Arabi Club managers
Brazil national under-17 football team managers
Ituano FC managers
Associação Atlética Internacional (Limeira) managers
Coritiba Foot Ball Club managers
Santos FC managers
Clube Atlético Bragantino managers
Expatriate football managers in Colombia
Expatriate football managers in Saudi Arabia
Expatriate football managers in the United Arab Emirates
Expatriate football managers in Peru
Expatriate football managers in Japan
Brazilian expatriate sportspeople in Colombia
Brazilian expatriate sportspeople in Saudi Arabia
Brazilian expatriate sportspeople in the United Arab Emirates
Brazilian expatriate sportspeople in Peru
Brazilian expatriate sportspeople in Japan